The Hythe by-election was a Parliamentary by-election held on 11 June 1912. The constituency returned one Member of Parliament (MP) to the House of Commons of the United Kingdom, elected by the first past the post voting system.

Electoral history
Sassoon was returned unopposed at the previous election. The previous election to that was contested and the result was as follows;

Candidates

Edward Sassoon

S Moorhouse

Result
Sassoon held his seat, however compared with the January 1910 election result, his Unionist majority dropped slightly;

Aftermath
A General Election was due to take place by the end of 1915. By the autumn of 1914, the following candidates had been adopted to contest that election; 
Unionist: Philip Sassoon
Liberal: William Deedes
Due to the outbreak of war, the election didn't take place until 1918;

Sassoon was the endorsed candidate of the Coalition Government.

References

1912 elections in the United Kingdom
By-elections to the Parliament of the United Kingdom in Kent constituencies
1912 in England
Folkestone and Hythe District
1910s in Kent